This is a list of the squads which took part at the 1970 Rugby League World Cup.

Australia
Coach: Harry Bath

Eric Simms
Lionel Williamson
John Cootes
Paul Sait 
Mark Harris
Bob Fulton 
Billy Smith 
John O'Neill 
Ron Turner 
Bob O'Reilly
Bob McCarthy
Ron Costello
Ron Coote (c) 
Ray Branighan
Elwyn Walters

France
Coach: Jep Lacoste

Jean-Pierre Clar (c), lock for Villeneuve
Roger Biffi, second row for Saint-Gaudens
Élie Bonal, wing for Carcassonne 
Floréal Bonet, front row for Albi
Jacques Cabero, hooker for Catalan
Jean Capdouze, five-eight for Catalan
Gérard Crémoux, second row for Villeneuve
Jean-Claude Cros. fullback for Albi
Francis de Nadaï, second row for Limoux
Raymond Gruppi, wing for Villeneuve 
Roger Garrigue, halfback for Toulouse
Germain Guiraud, halfback for Carcassonne
Serge Marsolan, wing for Saint-Gaudens
Hervé Mazard, second row for Lézignan
Michel Molinier, centre for Saint-Gaudens
Daniel Pellerin, wing for Villeneuve
André Ruiz, centre for Carcassonne
Christian Sabatié, prop for Villeneuve

Great Britain
Coach: Johnny Whiteley

Frank Myler (c)
Kevin Ashcroft
John Atkinson
Paul Charlton
David Chisnall
Ray Dutton
Tony Fisher
Bob Haigh
Dennis Hartley
Keith Hepworth
Chris Hesketh
Syd Hynes
Keri Jones
Doug Laughton
Mal Reilly
Mick Shoebottom
Alan Smith
Jimmy Thompson
Cliff Watson

New Zealand
Coach:Lory Blanchard

Mocky Brereton
Roy Christian
Graeme Cooksley
Bill Deacon
Doug Gailey
Lummy Graham
John Greengrass
Eddie Heatley
Elliot Kereopa
Tony Kriletich
Don Ladner
Bernie Lowther
Bob McGuinn
Colin O'Neil
Garry Smith
John Whittaker
Gary Woollard

External links
World Cup 1970 at Rugby League Project

1970 in rugby league
Rugby League World Cup squads